All Saints Anglican Church may refer to:

Australia
 All Saints Anglican Church, Ainslie, Australian Capital Territory
 All Saints Anglican Church, Brisbane, Queensland
 All Saints Anglican Church, Darnley Island, Queensland
 All Saints Anglican Church, Yandilla, Queensland
 All Saints Anglican Church, Henley Brook, Western Australia
 All Saints Anglican Church, Petersham, New South Wales

Canada
 All Saints Anglican Church (Dominion City, Manitoba)
 All Saints Anglican Church (Duck Lake, Saskatchewan)
 All Saints Anglican Church (Teulon, Manitoba)
 All Saints Anglican Church (Ottawa)
 All Saints Anglican Church (English Harbour, Newfoundland and Labrador)

United States
 All Saints Anglican Church (Raleigh, North Carolina)